Paranemachilus is a genus of stone loaches endemic to China.

Species
There are currently two recognized species in this genus:
 Paranemachilus genilepis S. Q. Zhu, 1983
 Paranemachilus pingguoensis X. Gan, 2013

References

Nemacheilidae